Eric Fabricius (6 December 1901 – 20 July 1969) was a Finnish sailor. He competed in the Dragon event at the 1952 Summer Olympics.

References

External links
 

1901 births
1969 deaths
Finnish male sailors (sport)
Olympic sailors of Finland
Sailors at the 1952 Summer Olympics – Dragon
Sportspeople from Turku